Dolphin Heads is a coastal town and suburb of Mackay in the Mackay Region, Queensland, Australia.

Geography

The waters of the Coral Sea form the eastern boundary and much of the northern boundary.

History 
The town was named on  9 October 1982. The locality was named and bounded on 3 September 1999.

Education 
There are no schools in Dolphin Heads. The nearest government primary school is Eimeo Road State School in Rural View to the south-west. The nearest government secondary school is Mackay Northern Beaches State High School, also in Rural View.

Amenities 
There is a park in Hermitage Drive.

Hazards 

The waters off Dolphin Heads can have strong currents and marine stingers.

References 

Towns in Queensland
Suburbs of Mackay, Queensland
Mackay Region